Entomoliva is a genus of sea snails, marine gastropod mollusks in the family Ancillariidae.

Species
Species within the genus Entomoliva include:
 Entomoliva incisa Bouchet & Kilburn, 1991
 Entomoliva mirabilis Bouchet & Kilburn, 1991

References

External links
 Bouchet P. & Kilburn R.N. (1991). A new genus of Ancillinae from New Caledonia, with the description of two new species. Bulletin du Museum National d'Histoire Naturelle 4A12 Page 531-539
 Kantor Yu.I., Fedosov A.E., Puillandre N., Bonillo C. & Bouchet P. (2017). Returning to the roots: morphology, molecular phylogeny and classification of the Olivoidea (Gastropoda: Neogastropoda). Zoological Journal of the Linnean Society. 180(3): 493-541

Ancillariidae